Two Hills Airport  is located  west of Two Hills, Alberta, Canada.

References

External links
Place to Fly on COPA's Places to Fly airport directory

Registered aerodromes in Alberta
County of Two Hills No. 21
Two Hills, Alberta